Delias candida is a butterfly in the family Pieridae. It was described by Samuel Constantinus Snellen van Vollenhoven in 1865. It is found in the Australasian realm
(Obi, Bachan, Halmahera, Morotai).

Subspecies
Delias candida candida (Bachan, Kasiruta, Mandioli, Obi)
Delias candida herodias Vollenhoven, 1865 (Halmahera)
Delias candida morotaiensis Morita, 1993 (Morotai)

References

External links
Delias at Markku Savela's Lepidoptera and Some Other Life Forms

candida
Butterflies described in 1865
Butterflies of Indonesia
Taxa named by Samuel Constantinus Snellen van Vollenhoven